Poliovirus receptor-related 1 (PVRL1), also known as nectin-1 and CD111 (formerly herpesvirus entry mediator C, HVEC) is a human protein of the immunoglobulin superfamily (IgSF), also considered a member of the nectins. It is a membrane protein with three extracellular immunoglobulin domains, a single transmembrane helix and a cytoplasmic tail. The protein can mediate Ca2+-independent cellular adhesion further characterizing it as IgSF cell adhesion molecule (IgSF CAM).

Function 

PVRL1 is an adhesion molecule found in a wide range of tissues where it localizes in various junctions such as the adherens junction of epithelial tissue or the chemical synapse of neurons. The cytoplasmic tail of PVRL1 can bind the protein afadin which is a scaffolding protein that binds actin.

In the chemical synapse PVRL1 interacts with PVRL3 (nectin-3) and both proteins can be found in neuronal tissue already in early stages of brain development as well as in aging brains. The two proteins have been found to localize asymmetrically along the chemical synapse, with PVRL1 primarily on the axonal side and PVRL3 on the dendritic side.

The protein has been revealed as one of the key players in mediating cellular entry of the Herpes simplex virus by interacting with the viral glycoprotein D (gD).

See also 
 Cluster of differentiation

Interactions 

PVRL1 has been shown to interact with MLLT4.

References

Further reading

External links 
 

Clusters of differentiation